A charioteer is someone who rides a chariot.

Charioteer or Charioteers may also refer to:

Charioteer (tank), a post-Second World War British tank
Operation Charioteer, a series of U.S. nuclear tests
The Charioteer, a novel by Mary Renault
The Charioteers, an American gospel and pop vocal group from 1930 to 1957

Astrology

Auriga (constellation), which is Latin for "the charioteer"

Film

Saarathi, a 2011 Indian film whose title translates as "Charioteer"